Patrick Kanner (born 29 April 1957) is a French politician serving as president of the Socialist group and Leader of the Opposition in the Senate since 2018. A member of the Socialist Party, he has represented the department of Nord since 2017. Kanner previously served as President of the General Council of Nord from 2011 to 2014 and Minister of the City, Youth and Sports from 2014 to 2017.

Biography

Family and youth
Patrick Kanner is the son of Polish Jews who fled Nazism to France. He grew up in Lille and studied at Lille 2 University of Health and Law.

Early political career
Kanner was elected to the municipal council of Lille in 1989. He became Mayor Pierre Mauroy's youngest adjoint the same year, a position he kept when Martine Aubry assumed the mayorship in 2001. In 1998, he was also elected to the General Council of Nord.

Ministership under François Hollande
Elected to the presidency of the Nord General Council in 2011, Kanner became Minister of the City, Youth and Sports in the Second Valls government, succeeding Najat Vallaud-Belkacem. He remained in office in the Cazeneuve government.

Senator for Nord
In 2017, Kanner was elected to the Senate. Following the announced retirement of Didier Guillaume, he was elected president of the Socialist group in the Senate with 47 votes, against Laurence Rossignol with 25 votes, on 23 January 2018.

References

1957 births
Living people
French people of Polish-Jewish descent
20th-century French Jews
Politicians from Lille
Socialist Party (France) politicians
21st-century French politicians
Lille University of Science and Technology alumni
Senators of Nord (French department)
Chevaliers of the Légion d'honneur
Knights of the Ordre national du Mérite